A re-entrant (international) or draw is a terrain feature formed by two parallel ridges or spurs with low ground in between them. The area of low ground itself is the draw, and it is defined by the spurs surrounding it. Re-entrants are similar to valleys on a smaller scale; however, while valleys are by nature parallel to a ridgeline, a re-entrant is perpendicular to the ridge, and rises with the surrounding ground, disappearing up-slope. It is usually etched in a hillside by water flow, is usually dry, but many contain an ephemeral stream or loose rocks from eroded rockfall.

In a re-entrant or draw the ground always slopes downward in only one direction, and upward in the other three. The slope on a draw is generally quite sharp, with a clearly established fall line and characterized by a generally steep vertical drop over a short horizontal distance.

See also

References

Canyons and gorges
Slope landforms